Lashi (endonym Lacid) is a Burmish language. Although the endonym Lashi is often used by Western researchers, the people refer to themselves and their language as Lacid. It is according to Nishi (1999: 70) in the Maruic branch, which preserves the preglottalized initials of Proto-Burmish in the most phonotactic environments.

Data on Lashi is available in the following publications (A Literature Review on Segments in Lacid (Lashi) ,) (Luce 1985: Charts S, T, V; Huang et al. 1992; Wannemacher 1995-7, as cited in Mann 1998, and Yabu 1988).

Distribution
There are conflicting reports about the size of the Lashi population. Reports range from 30,000 to 60,000. In China, Lashi (Leqi) speakers are distributed in Mangshi City (formerly Luxi County), Ruili City, Longchuan County, and Yingjiang County of western Yunnan Province (Dai 2007:5). Mangshi has the most Lashi speakers, who are distributed in the following townships.
Manghai (မန်ဟိုင်, 芒海镇)
Zhongshan (ကျုင်းရှန်မြို့ , 中山乡)
Dongshan (သုင်ရှန်မြို့ , 东山乡)
Santai (ဆန်ထိုင်မြို့ , 三台乡, in Gonglin ကုင်လင် 拱岭寨 and Manggang မန်ကန်芒岗寨 villages)

Lashi (လရှီ) is also spoken in eastern Shan State, Burma. Lashi was originally spoken in the downstream area of the Ngochang Hka river valley, a tributary of the N’Mai Hka river, while Ngochang was originally spoken in the upstream area of the Ngochang Hka river valley.

The Chashan language, which is closely related to Lashi, is spoken in nearby Pianma Township (片马镇), Lushui County.

References

Further reading

 
 
 
 
 
 
 . (unpublished manuscript cited by Mann 1998).

External links
Lacid language site

Burmish languages
Languages of Myanmar